Rollin is both a surname and a masculine given name. Notable people with the name include:

Surname
Anita Rollin, Sri Lankan snowboarder
Bernard Rollin (1943–2021), American philosopher, ethicist and author
Betty Rollin (born 1936), American journalist
Charles Rollin (1661–1741), French historian and educationist
Dominique Rollin (born 1982), Canadian cyclist
Henri Rollin (1885–1955), French essayist
Jean Rollin (1938–2010), French film director, actor and writer
Kenneth Rollin (born 1937), English rugby league player
Louis Rollin (1879-1952), French politician
The Rollin Sisters, five African-American sisters who were influential in politics in the Reconstruction Era

Given name
Rollin V. Ankeny (1830-1901), American Civil War Union brevet brigadier general
Rollin Cook (1890–1975), American baseball player
Rollin M. Daggett (1831–1901), American politician and diplomat
Rollin Dart (1925–2016), American banker
Rollin Josiah Dutton (1884-1955), American businessman and politician
Rollin Glewwe (1933-2020), American politician and businessman
Rollin Lynde Hartt (1869–1946), American journalist
Rollin Hotchkiss (1911–2004), American biochemist
Rollin Howard (1840–1879), American minstrel performer
Rollin Howell (born 1929), American politician
Rollin Jarrett (born 1960), American actor and screenwriter
Rollin King (1931–2014), American businessman
Rollin Kirby (1875–1952), American political cartoonist
Rollin Carolas Mallary (1784–1831), American lawyer and politician
Rollin H. Person (1850-1917), American jurist
Rollin Prather (1925-1996), Canadian football player
Rollin Putzier (born 1965), American football player
Rollin R. Rees (1865–1935), American politician
Rollin C. Richmond, American geneticist and academic
Rollin D. Salisbury (1858–1922), American geologist and educator
Rollin B. Sanford (1874–1957), American politician
Rollin S. Sturgeon (1877-1961), American silent film director
Rollin White (1817-1892), American gunsmith and inventor
Rollin S. Williamson (1839–1889), American politician
Rollin S. Woodruff (1854–1925), American politician

Fictional characters
Rollin Hand, secret agent in the Mission Impossible TV series

See also
Rollins (disambiguation)
Rollen, a list of people with the given name or surname

Masculine given names